Dorsum brunescens is a moth of the family Erebidae first described by Michael Fibiger in 2011. It is found in western Thailand.

The wingspan is about 12 mm. The head, patagia, anterior part of tegulae and prothorax are black brown. The basal part of the costa, costal part of the triangular medial area and terminal area (including fringes) on the forewings are black brown. The crosslines are indistinct and beige. The terminal line is indicated by black interveinal dots. The hindwing ground colour is grey with an indistinct discal spot.

References

Micronoctuini
Moths described in 2011
Taxa named by Michael Fibiger